"" (literally: "The Oath"; also known as "") was written by S. Ansky in 1902. This Yiddish song became the anthem of the socialist, General Jewish Labour Bund in the early 1900s. The source of its melody is unknown. Bundists sing this song virtually every time they meet. For example, it was sung at the 100th anniversary (1998) of the General Jewish Labour Bund in Paris, Marek Edelman's funeral, and the 50th anniversary (2009) reunion of Camp Hemshekh. The song exhorts Jews to unite, and to commit themselves body and soul to the defeat of the Russian Tsar and of capitalism.

Lyrics

See also
 S. Ansky
 General Jewish Labour Bund

References

External links
 A recording of "Di Shvue"
 Music and words of "Di Shvue"
 Yiddish and english of "Di Shvue"

Yiddish-language songs
Bundist songs
Russian anthems
Political party songs
1902 songs